Michael Graversen (born 27 August 1980) is a Danish documentary filmmaker.  He graduated from the National Film and Television School in England and directs documentaries often of an existential or socially-relevant character. His work has won awards and been selected for festivals including IDFA and CPH:DOX.

Biography 

In 2015, Michael Graversen directed Dreaming of Denmark. For over 3 years the director followed the underground life of the Afghan boy Wasiullah – one of the many unaccompanied refugee children that disappear in Europe after they receive a rejection on their asylum claim. The film was nominated for a F:ACT Award at CPH:DOX and was broadcast in prime time at DR1. Subsequently, the film has toured international festivals, TV and won awards – most recently the Amnesty International Award at Giffoni International Film Festival. 

In 2013, Michael Graversen directed the predecessor No Man's land. The film is a portrait of an asylum center in Jægerspris for unaccompanied minor refugees and was selected for numerous festivals including IDFA.

Dreaming of Denmark premiered at the peak of the refugee crisis in Europe and the director has regularly appeared in Danish and international  media advocating for the rights of refugees and in particular the unaccompanied minors. Michael Graversen was one of the first to make films about and document the lives of the unaccompanied refugee children in Europe. In 2016 he received the Salaam Film Prize 2016 as a result of his work.

In 2012, Michael Graversen directed The Last Night Shift about women keeping lone dying people company in their final hours. The director has also worked with experimental and poetic film as An Anxious Mind (selected for Australian Experimental Film Festival) which is about Michael Graversen's own experience of having been affected by childhood cancer. Michael Graversen's first film was Toxic Ground about a pollution scandal in his hometown Grindsted. Toxic Ground aired on DR2 and was selected for CPH:DOX and created a lot of debate. Subsequently, a public meeting in Grindsted was held and a bill was presented in Danish parliament.

Filmography 
 Dreaming of Denmark (2015)
 No Man’s Land (2013)
 The Last Night Shift (2012)
 An Anxious Mind (2012)
 The Pact (2011)
 Toxic Ground (2006)

Awards and selection of festivals 
 IDFA, official selection
 CPH:DOX, nominated for F:ACT Award
 Amnesty International Award, Giffoni International Film Festival
 Best Documentary 2nd prize, Giffoni International Film Festival
 Freestyle Award at Mo&Friese International Children’s Film Festival
 Helsinki International Film Festival
 Thessaloniki Documentary Festival
 Human Rights Watch Film Festival, Amsterdam
 Nordische Filmtage, Lübeck,
 Japan Prize, International Educational Program Contest
 One World, Romania
 Human Rights & Arts Film Festival, Melbourne
 Salaam Film Prize 2016
 Olympia International Film Festival
 Uppsala International Short Film Festival
 Belo Horizonte International Short Film Festival
 World Film Festival, Estonia
 Watch Docs International Human Rights Film Festival
 Document Human Rights Film Festival, Glasgow
 BUFF International Children's Film festival, Malmø

References

External links 
 

1980 births
Living people
Alumni of the National Film and Television School
Danish documentary filmmakers